Battle of Memories is a 2017 Chinese science fiction crime thriller film co-written and directed by Leste Chen and starring Huang Bo, Xu Jinglei, Duan Yihong, Yang Zishan and Ann Hsu. It was released in China on April 28, 2017 and received critical acclaim from critics.

Plot
Jiang Feng, a writer, underwent a procedure to erase some of his memories. At the memory center, there was an incident and he dropped his memory-restore-key card. He delivers divorce papers to his wife, but she refuses to sign the divorce papers until he restores his memories. After his memory restoration procedure, he finds himself in the mind of a serial killer.

Feng goes to police with this information that he can see the murders being committed, but in those memories, he sees himself as murderer. At first, officers Shen Hanqiang and Lei Zi refuse to believe him, but after finding out similarities of his narration of crime scene and actual evidence they start believing his story. Feng realizes that killer has his memories and might try to kill his wife so he stages an escape but fails. At the police station his wife Zhang Daichen meets medical officer Chen Shanshan and befriends her.

While officers wait for Feng's memories to provide a clue towards killer's identity, Lei Zi deduces that killer might be a woman who was best friends with the victim, pointing out that officer Chan might be the killer. Feng flees the prison to save his wife who is with Chan but instead disturbs his wife.

Later it is revealed that office Shen Hanqiang is the actual killer who was using officer Chan to cover up his tracks. Shen kills Chan and as he tries to kill Feng, Daichen comes in between. Shen, having memories of Feng, can not shoot at Daichen. Lei Zi arrives at the scene and arrests Shen. Feng and his wife Daichen reconcile.

Cast
Bo Huang as Jiang Feng.
Xu Jinglei as Zhang Daichen, wife of Jiang Feng
Yihong Duan as Shen Hanqiang, a police detective.
Yang Zishan as Chen Shanshan, police medical officer.
"Tiffany Ann" Wei-ning Hsu as a mystery woman.

Production
Principal photography took place in Thailand.

References

External links

Chinese science fiction thriller films
Chinese crime thriller films
2010s science fiction thriller films
2017 crime thriller films
Films directed by Leste Chen
Films shot in Thailand
Fiction about memory erasure and alteration
2017 films
2010s Mandarin-language films